Nizhneye Ponizovye is a rural locality (a village) in Megorskoye Rural Settlement, Vytegorsky District, Vologda Oblast, Russia. The population was 163 as of 2002. There are 4 streets.

Geography 
Nizhneye Ponizovye is located 35 km southwest of Vytegra (the district's administrative centre) by road. Verkhneye Ponizovye is the nearest rural locality.

References 

Rural localities in Vytegorsky District